Illa de l'Aire (also Isla del Aire in Spanish) in an islet on the southeast coast of Menorca, in the Baleric Islands, close to Punta Prima, Sant Lluís. It is administrated by the municipality of Sant Lluís.

The island covers 34 hectares and has a circumference of  3.3 km. Its highest point was 15 m above sea level until the construction of the  Illa de l'Aire lighthouse. The island is defined as the most southernly area of the Balearic Sea, a small body of water that is generally accepted a region of the Mediterranean Sea.

The island has an endemic lizard subspecies, Podarcis lilfordi lilfordi (Günther, 1874). On Menorca, it is better known as the sargantana negra (black lizard), though the lizards are able to change their skin colour to blend in with their surroundings. Very few people are actually allowed to land on the island as this would affect the lizards' unadvanced immune systems. Indeed, the Illa de l'Aire is sometimes known as "Lizard Island", and forms a scenic backdrop for the resort of Punta Prima and the municipality of Sant Lluís.

The island has a population of 300 rabbits, an introduced animal, these were used as part of a self-spreading vaccine field trial in 2000 aimed at generating immunity to myxomatosis and  rabbit hemorrhagic disease.

References 

 Ferran Ramón-Cortés, "La Isla De Los 5 Faros", del Nuevo Extremo, 2005.

External links 
 Isla del Aire en Google Maps

Islets of Menorca